Bartlett is a city in Shelby County, Tennessee, United States. The population was 57,786 at the 2020 U.S. Census.

History
Bartlett, originally called "Union Depot", first served as the last major Tennessean depot along the westward stagecoach route from Nashville. It later shifted to serve as a rail station after the stagecoach route was replaced by the Memphis & Ohio Railroad. An agricultural community gradually emerged around the depot and subsequent station that saw little growth until after the American Civil War.

The community saw quick growth during Reconstruction, and by 1886 was home to a school, two gristmills, three churches, several general stores, and about 300 inhabitants. It had been officially incorporated on November 1, 1866, with a population of less than 100 under the inaugural mayorship of Bryan Wither. The city derived its name from Major Gabriel M. Bartlett, a planter and pioneer settler of the area, whose homeplace was located on the old Raleigh-Somerville Road (Stage Road) at the present location of Bartlett Station Plaza.

Geography
Bartlett is adjacent to the northeastern boundary of Memphis.

The annexation reserves of the city extend another .

Demographics

2020 census

As of the 2020 United States Census, there were 57,786 people, 20,359 households, and 15,959 families residing in the city.

2019
As of the 2019 census estimates, there were 59,445 people and 20,359 households residing in the city. The city was the 10th largest city in Tennessee (2nd in Shelby County, after Memphis). The racial makeup of the city was 69.0% White, 21.3% African American, 0.28% Native American, 2.9% Asian, 0.04% Pacific Islander, 0.37% from other races, and 0.77% from two or more races. Hispanic or Latino of any race were 1.14% of the population.

There were 20,044 households, out of which 44.0% had children under the age of 18 living with them, 74.6% were married couples living together, 8.7% had a female householder with no husband present, and 14.2% were non-families. 12.1% of all households were made up of individuals, and 4.3% had someone living alone who was 65 years of age or older. The average household size was 2.92 and the average family size was 3.18.

In the city, the population was spread out, with 29.1% under the age of 18, 6.8% from 18 to 24, 30.0% from 25 to 44, 25.5% from 45 to 64, and 8.6% who were 65 years of age or older. The median age was 37 years. For every 100 females, there were 95.4 males. For every 100 females age 18 and over, there were 91.2 males.

The median income for a household in the city was $84,305,  and the median income for a family was $84,305 (these figures had risen to $74,091 and $80,739 respectively as of a 2007 estimate). Males had a median income of $45,281 versus $32,382 for females. The per capita income for the city was $24,616. About 2.1% of families and 2.7% of the population were below the poverty line, including 3.2% of those under age 18 and 5.7% of those age 65 or over.

Population growth
In existence since about 1829, Bartlett was incorporated in 1866 and remained a small town for another 100 years. From the "old" town of only 508 people at Stage Road and the railroad in 1960, Bartlett grew rapidly in the 1970s and 1980s both through new residents, largely due to "white flights" from Memphis, and through annexation, primarily to the east and north, to over 57,786 people today. In 2022, it was the eleventh largest city in Tennessee.

Arts and culture

Performing Arts and Conference Center
The Bartlett Performing Arts & Conference Center, also known as BPACC, was finished in 1999 where it held its first show by Art Garfunkel.  BPACC is located at 3663 Appling Road, directly across the street from the Bartlett Police Station and Appling Middle School.  The facility is not limited to performances but can be rented out for other events such as seminars or business meetings.

Places of interest
The John H. McFadden House was listed in the National Register of Historic Places in 1994. It is located at 3712 Broadway.

Davies Manor Plantation
Davies Manor Plantation is a historic property that includes the oldest log home in Shelby County open to the public, thirty-two acres of plantation land, and numerous outbuildings. These outbuildings range from a tenant cabin to a commissary, a gristmill to an outhouse. The property contains several gardens, including a kitchen garden and a medicinal herb garden.

Nicholas Gotten House

The Nicholas Gotten House is located at 2969 Court Street. It houses the Bartlett Museum, a local history museum operated by the Bartlett Historical Society. The white frame structure was built by Nicholas Gotten in 1871 in the New England saltbox style. A saltbox is a wooden frame house with a long, pitched roof that slopes down to the back.

Parks and recreation

The Bartlett Recreation Center is a  facility that was completed in August 2000.  The recreation center is located at 7700 Flaherty Place directly behind the Bartlett Police Station.  The recreation center is a popular place amongst the people of Bartlett with its swimming pool, racquetball courts, basketball courts, running track, and workout rooms.  Since its opening the recreation center has done remarkably well and required no help from the city to remain open.

Education
Bartlett's public school system was part of the Shelby County Schools until the end of the 2013–2014 school year. On July 16, 2013, the residents of Bartlett approved a referendum to form a Bartlett City School District. This district launched in fall 2014 and includes the 11 school buildings within Bartlett city limits, according to an agreement reached between parties to a federal lawsuit. The district's superintendent is David Stephens, former deputy superintendent of Shelby County Schools.

Public schools
Residents are in the Bartlett City Schools.

Private schools
Bartlett Baptist Pre-School Kin
St. Ann Elementary School

Notable people
Notable people from Bartlett, Tennessee:
Rozelle Claxton (1913-1995), jazz pianist
Ronald Rozelle Davis (born 1972), football cornerback
Eric Hanhold (born 1993), baseball pitcher
Erin Hatley, beauty pageant titleholder; was Miss Tennessee in 2011
Sammy Swindell (born 1955), sprint car driver
Jacob Clinton Wilson (born 1990), baseball utility player
Daniel Paul Wright (born 1991), baseball pitcher

References

External links

CityOfBartlett.org - Official City Website
 Bartlett Area Chamber of Commerce

 
Cities in Tennessee
Cities in Shelby County, Tennessee
Memphis metropolitan area
Populated places established in 1830
1830 establishments in Tennessee